Bukit Timah Single Member Constituency (SMC) was a single member constituency in Bukit Timah, Singapore. It was formerly known as Bukit Timah Constituency before 1988.

History
In 1951, Rural West Constituency was broken up into Bukit Timah constituency and Seletar constituency . 

In 1955, the constituency was broken up to form various constituencies, Bukit Panjang, Pasir Panjang, Queenstown, Sembawang and Southern Islands SMC. In 1959, it was further broken up to form Jurong SMC. 

In 1972, the constituency was broken up to form Bukit Batok SMC, followed by in 1980 distributed to Ayer Rajah SMC, Clementi SMC and West Coast SMC with the growing development of Clementi, and in 1984 to Yuhua SMC and Hong Kah SMC with the growing development of Jurong East. 

In 1988, as part of Singapore's electoral reforms, the constituency was renamed as Bukit Timah Single Member Constituency. 

In 1997, it was absorbed into Bukit Timah GRC along with Bukit Batok SMC, Jurong SMC, Ulu Pandan SMC and Yuhua SMC.

In 2001, the SMC was recreated as Bukit Timah GRC was broken up to form Holland–Bukit Panjang GRC, Jurong GRC and Bukit Timah SMC. In 2006, the SMC was absorbed into another GRC, Holland–Bukit Timah GRC.

Member of Parliament

Elections

Elections in 1950s

Elections in 1960s

Elections in 1970s

Elections in 1980s

Elections in 1990s

Elections in 2000s

Historical maps

See also
Bukit Timah GRC

References

Singaporean electoral divisions
Bukit Timah
Clementi
Jurong East
Constituencies established in 1951
Constituencies disestablished in 2006
1951 establishments in Singapore
2006 disestablishments in Singapore